Dunbartonshire was a county constituency of the House of Commons of Great Britain (at Westminster) from 1708 to 1801 and of the House of Commons of the Parliament of the United Kingdom (also Westminster) from 1801 to 1950.

Creation
The British parliamentary constituency was created in 1708 following the Acts of Union, 1707 and replaced the former Parliament of Scotland shire constituency of Dunbartonshire .

History
The constituency elected one Member of Parliament (MP) by the first past the post system until the seat was split in 1950.

It elected one Member of Parliament (MP) using the first-past-the-post voting system.

Boundaries 

The constituency was created to cover the county of Dumbarton (later Dunbarton) minus any parliamentary burgh or part thereof within the county. From 1832 to 1918, however, under the Representation of the People (Scotland) Act 1832, the Representation of the People (Scotland) Act 1868 and the Redistribution of Seats Act 1885, the boundaries of counties and burghs for purposes of parliamentary representation were not necessarily those for other purposes.

The Representation of the People Act 1918 brought constituency boundaries generally into alignment with local government boundaries established under the Local Government (Scotland) Act 1889 and subsequent related legislation, but there were later changes to local government boundaries which were not reflected in new constituency boundaries until 1950, the same year that the Dunbartonshire constituency was abolished, under the House of Commons (Redistribution of Seats) Act 1949.

''For the period 1832 to 1918 boundary details below are nominal, and for the period 1918 to 1950 they are those applicable in 1918.

For the 1708 (first) general election and every subsequent election of the Parliament of Great Britain the Dumbartonshire constituency consisted of the county of Dumbarton minus the burgh of Dumbarton, which was a component of the Clyde Burghs constituency.

In 1801 the Parliament of Great Britain was merged with the Parliament of Ireland to form the Parliament of the United Kingdom. The Dumbartonshire constituency retained its boundaries as a constituency of the Parliament of Great Britain for the 1802 (first) general election of the new parliament and for the general elections of 1806, 1807, 1812, 1818, 1820, 1826, 1830 and 1831.

Nominally, the constituency had the same boundaries for the 1832 general election, but the burgh of Dumbarton was now a component of Kilmarnock Burghs. 1832 boundaries were used also in all general elections up to December 1910.

For the 1918 general election the constituency was defined as covering the county of Dunbarton minus the burghs of Dumbarton and Clydebank, which comprised Dumbarton Burghs. 1918 boundaries were used also in all general elections up to 1945.

For the 1950 general election new constituency boundaries divided the county of Dunbarton between the East Dunbartonshire and West Dunbartonshire constituencies, both entirely within the county.

Members of Parliament

MPs 1708–1832

MPs 1832–1950

Election results

Elections in the 1830s

Elections in the 1840s

Elections in the 1850s

Elections in the 1860s

A petition was lodged in this election, against Stirling, but was later withdrawn after he decided not to defend his claim to the seat, allowing Smollett to be declared duly elected.

Elections in the 1870s

Elections in the 1880s

Elections in the 1890s

Elections in the 1900s

Elections in the 1910s

Elections in the 1920s

Elections in the 1930s

Elections in the 1940s

Notes and references 

Historic parliamentary constituencies in Scotland (Westminster)
Dunbartonshire
Politics of East Dunbartonshire
Politics of West Dunbartonshire
Constituencies of the Parliament of the United Kingdom established in 1708
Constituencies of the Parliament of the United Kingdom disestablished in 1950